Dieter Lüst (born 21 September 1956 in Chicago) is a German physicist, full professor for mathematical physics at the Ludwig Maximilian University of Munich since 2004 and a director of the Max Planck Institute for Physics in Munich. His research focusses on string theory. In 2000, he received the Gottfried Wilhelm Leibniz Prize of the Deutsche Forschungsgemeinschaft, which is the highest honour awarded in German research.

Lüst was a Fellow at the European Organization for Nuclear Research (CERN) in Geneva between 1988 and 1990, and was there again with a Heisenberg fellowship in 1990/93.

References

External links
Max-Planck-Institute for Physics (Werner-Heisenberg-Institute)
Dieter Lüst's homepage at the LMU

Living people
21st-century German physicists
Academic staff of the Ludwig Maximilian University of Munich
Gottfried Wilhelm Leibniz Prize winners
1956 births
People associated with CERN
20th-century German physicists